This is a list of rural localities in the Novosibirsk Oblast. Novosibirsk Oblast (Novosibirskaya oblast) is a federal subject of Russia (an oblast) located in southwestern Siberia. Its administrative and economic center is the city of Novosibirsk. The population was 2,665,911 as of the 2010 Census.

Locations 
 8 Marta
 Abakumovo
 Abramovo
 Abrashino
 Baryshevo
 Baykal
 Biaza
 Dovolnoye
 Fedosikha
 Goluboy Zaliv
 Gusiny Brod
 III Internatsional
 Kochki
 Kruglikovo
 Kyshtovka
 Laptevka
 Lokti
 Michurinsky
 Novolugovoye
 Orlovka
 Severnoye
 Ubinskoye
 Ust-Tarka
 Vengerovo
 Verkh-Tula
 Verkh-Irmen
 Verkh-Uryum
 Zdvinsk

See also
 
 Lists of rural localities in Russia

References

Novosibirsk Oblast